The Artificial Kid is a science fiction novel by American writer Bruce Sterling. It was originally published in 1980.

The Artificial Kid takes place on the planet Reverie, a world of coral continents, levitating islands, and the corrosive, transformative wilderness of "The Mass."  Reverie has been transformed into a utopia/dystopia, with a stark class division.  Arti, a heavily biologically modified boy from the Decriminalized Zone, becomes a pop star by selling videos of himself engaging in bloody combat with other fighters for the entertainment of the upper classes.  When Reverie's founder, Moses Moses emerges from seven centuries of cryosleep, and Arti discovers an unpleasant secret about his past, both have to flee to escape from the powers of the "Cabal" that controls Reverie from behind the scenes.

Reception
Dave Langford reviewed The Artificial Kid for White Dwarf #69, and stated that "Without being exactly convincing, it's lavishly exuberant in the way SF used to be and literate in the ways it wasn't."

Reviews
Review by John Shirley (1980) in Science Fiction Review, Winter 1980
Review by Bob Mecoy (1980) in Future Life, November 1980
Review by Christopher Priest (1981) in The Magazine of Fantasy & Science Fiction, May 1981
Review [French] by Stéphane Nicot? (1982) in Fiction, #334
Review [German] by Harald Pusch (1985) in Science Fiction Times, März 1985
Review by Gregory Feeley (1986) in Foundation, #37 Autumn 1986
Review by Don D'Ammassa (1988) in Science Fiction Chronicle, #100 January 1988
Review [German] by Gregory Feeley (1991) in Das Science Fiction Jahr Ausgabe 1991

References

1980 American novels
1980 science fiction novels
Novels by Bruce Sterling
Harper & Row books